Dorothy Quimby is a fictional character created by author Beverly Cleary.  Married to Robert Quimby, Dorothy is the mother to Beezus, Ramona, and Roberta Quimby.

Character
Dorothy made her debut in Beezus and Ramona, the first book in the Ramona series. Previously a stay-at-home mother, she began work as a doctor's office receptionist after Robert was laid off.

Dorothy has a younger sister, Beatrice, after whom Beezus is named.  Beezus and Ramona firmly believe that Dorothy and Beatrice had always gotten along famously, but the girls are shocked when Dorothy and Beatrice admit that, when they were children, their relationship was, at times, as contentious as Beezus and Ramona's; Dorothy cites a particular incident in which Beatrice, jealous that Dorothy had acquired an autograph book, proceeded to sign her name in multiple permutations on every page of the book.

Media portrayals
Mrs. Quimby is played by Lynda Mason Green in the 1988 television series Ramona, and by Bridget Moynahan in the 2010 film Ramona and Beezus.

See also

Fictional
Film

References

External links
The World of Beverly Cleary
Selena Gomez And Joey King Recall 'Ramona And Beezus' On-Set Pranks
Ramona and Beezus Mother and Daughter Film Review

Beverly Cleary characters
Female characters in literature
Literary characters introduced in 1955